Kaiichiro Suematsu (June 18, 1875 – June 26, 1947) was a Japanese politician who served as governor of Hiroshima Prefecture from September 1926 to November 1927. He was governor of Tokushima Prefecture (1915-1917), Shiga Prefecture (1923-1925) and Ibaraki Prefecture (1925-1926). He was mayor of Beppu, Ōita from 1942 to 1946.

References

Governors of Hiroshima
1875 births
1947 deaths
Japanese Home Ministry government officials
Governors of Tokushima Prefecture
Governors of Shiga Prefecture
Governors of Ibaraki Prefecture